is a 1986 comedy pink film directed by Shuji Kataoka and starring Shiro Shimomoto, Hiromi Saotome and Yutaka Ikejima.

Synopsis
S&M Hunter is a super genius nawashi whose specialty is tying up women in order to tame them. When the sukeban gang The Bombers kidnap a man to use as their personal sex slave, his boyfriend asks S&M Hunter for help. S&M Hunter accepts the mission to defeat the gang.

Cast
Shiro Shimomoto: S&M Hunter
Hiromi Saotome: Meg
Yutaka Ikejima: Dungeon Master
Ayu Kiyokawa: Machiko (Machi in the US release)
Bunmei Tobayama: Saeki (Joe in the US release)
Naomi Sugishita: Maria
Akira Fukuda: Wataru (Jack in the US release)
Mie Mogami: gang member
Utako Sarashina: gang member

Availability
Shuji Kataoka filmed S&M Hunter for Kokuei and it was released theatrically in Japan by Shintōhō Eiga in February 1986. The U.S premiere was September 2008 in Austin Fantastic Fest. The second appearance of this film in the U.S. is at San Francisco Independent Film Festival. Region 0 DVD by US-based company Pinkeiga has been released since January 14, 2009 in USA. The film is also available as a digital download or streaming file on the Pink Eiga site as of 2012.

Reviews

References

External links
 
 

1986 films
1980s sex comedy films
Pink films
Shintōhō Eiga films
Japanese sex comedy films
1980s Japanese-language films
BDSM in films
Bondage (BDSM)
1980s Japanese films